Mariinskaya Women's Gymnasium is an historic building  in Pushkin, Saint Petersburg. 

The building was erected as a government office between 1844 and 1845.  It was converted to a school for women in 1865. In the 20th century, the building served as a labor school, then a music school and finally an arts academy. It is an object of cultural heritage.

History 
In 1844 or 1845, Mariinskaya was constructed  to house the Office of the Chief Executive of the palace boards and Tsarskoe Selo. It was the project of architect D.E. Efimov. The construction was headed by N.S. Nikitin.  

When the office was abolished in 1865, the building was redeveloped into a girl's gymnasium The redevelopment was conducted by the architect A. F. Vidov, and a year later the gymnasium moved to a new building.  

In 1874 the building was expanded to include a new 7th grade gymnasium. In the years 1874-1875 works were conducted by A.F. Vidov.  

Between 1906 and 1907, a third floor was added. The architect was G. D. Grima, the civil engineer V. A. Lipavsky.  A. A. Akhmatova (Gorenko) studied in the gymnasium during the period 1900-1905. 

After the October Revolution, the gymnasium became the 2nd Detskoselskaya Soviet labor school. Between 1922 and 1924. Daniil Kharms (Yuvachev) was a student there. 

In later years, the building housed a music school, now the Tsarskoye Selo Academy of Arts named after Akhmatova. In 2010 a new gymnasium building was added.

Architecture 
The original finish of the Efimov project was preserved on the facade of the first floor, includes a ribbon rust, fan-shaped castle stones. In general, the repeatedly changing facade is an integral composition, in the center of which are elongated semicircular windows of the third floor. The building is completed by the attic.

References

Literature

Sources 
 
 

Buildings and structures in Pushkin
1845 establishments in the Russian Empire
Gymnasiums in Russia
Eclectic architecture
Cultural heritage monuments in Saint Petersburg